The R359 is a regional route in the Northern Cape province of South Africa that runs along the south bank of the Orange River from Augrabies Falls through Augrabies and Kakamas to Upington.

Route
The western end of the route is at the entrance to the Augrabies Falls National Park. The R359 overlaps the N14 route as far as Kakamas, where the N14 crosses the Orange River to run along the north bank, while the R359 continues on the south bank. It crosses the R27 provincial route opposite Keimoes before reaching its eastern end at the N10 national route across the river from Upington.

References

Regional Routes in the Northern Cape